Roi Atar (born April 4, 1994) is an Israeli footballer who plays for Hapoel Afula.

Honours
Israeli Youth Championship:
Championships (1): 2012–13
Runner-up (1): 2011–12
Youth State Cup:
Winner (1): 2013
Runner-up (1): 2012

External links

Profile and Statistics at ONE.co.il

1994 births
Living people
Israeli Jews
Israeli footballers
Maccabi Haifa F.C. players
Hapoel Acre F.C. players
Hapoel Nir Ramat HaSharon F.C. players
Hapoel Ra'anana A.F.C. players
Hapoel Nof HaGalil F.C. players
Hapoel Afula F.C. players
Ironi Nesher F.C. players
Maccabi Ironi Tirat HaCarmel F.C. players
Israeli Premier League players
Liga Leumit players
Israeli people of Moroccan-Jewish descent
Footballers from Tirat Carmel
Association football forwards